Prerana is a non-governmental organization (NGO) that works in the red-light districts of Mumbai, India to protect children vulnerable to commercial sexual exploitation and trafficking. It was established in 1986.

The organization runs three night care centers for children at risk, as well as shelter homes and a residential training center for girls rescued from the trafficking trade. The work of Prerana has been recognized nationally and internationally as being at the forefront of leading the global fight against trafficking and sexual exploitation.

Prerana is registered under the Societies Registration Act (Registration No: 372/1990). Its name means "inspiration" in Hindi and Sanskrit.

History

1988 Prerana opened its first Night Care Center to provide shelter for children of female victims of human trafficking living in red lights areas.

1989 Prerana created the Institutional Placement Program to suit the specific needs of children living in the red light areas. It aimed to de-link children from exploitative and abusive environments/situations, and to provide long-term residential care and development.

1990 The Educational Support Program designed to suit the needs of children living in the red light areas was created.

1998 Programmatic interventions by Prerana were mentioned in the first National Plan of Action to Combat Trafficking and Commercial Sexual Exploitation of Women and Children, Government of India, 1998.

1999 Prerana started an Anti-Trafficking Centre, a specialized resource center on trafficking problems and anti-trafficking initiatives. It was an initiative encouraged by the Department of State, United States Government.

2002-2005 Prerana was appointed to working groups of the Ministry of Health, Government of India to contribute to both the 10th and 11th Five Year Plans. It was also appointed as the Expert by the National Commission of Women and the Central and State Level Advisory Committee to combat human trafficking.

2004 US Government nominated a Prerana Trustee as United Nations Special Rapporteur on Human Trafficking.

2007 Prerana began offering training to police on trafficking and commercial sexual exploitation.

2010 Prerana launched a physical resource center and opened Naunihal Girls' Shelter.

2011 In August 2011, Prerana was invited to be a member on the Supreme Court of India panel on the problems faced by women in sex work in India to work on prevention of trafficking and rehabilitation of sex workers.

Focus areas
 Prevention of second generation trafficking of children of women victims of prostitution
 Child Protection
 Victim Rehabilitation – working with victims of commercial sexual exploitation and trafficking and other forms of violence 
 Advocacy – on anti-trafficking, child rights, and human rights.
 Training and Capacity Building – for state bodies and other organizations on issues related to anti-trafficking.
When describing the overall vision of the organization in an interview with Firstpost, Project Manager Kashina Kareem said it was to see children escape the flesh trade "as informed individuals who... in turn can rescue their mothers".

Programs

Night Care Center (NCC) Program

The NCC was conceptualized for the first time worldwide in 1986 at the Kamathipura red light area in Mumbai. It provides a safe place for women in prostitution to protect their children from the dangers of the red light district during the night. The NCC; functioning out of the Kamathipura, Falkland Road and Vashi provides a package of services on a 24-7 basis such as shelter, nutrition, healthcare, education, recreation, and so on.

Educational Support Program

Prerana instituted the first comprehensive Educational Support Program (ESP) in India for children from red light areas. The ESP works with children and addresses their needs in education as well as personal and professional development. The ESP provides complementary and remedial education, extra-curricular activities, life skills education, and personal development inputs. The ESP also sponsors older children for vocational training programs. Prerana runs 3 ESPs in the Mumbai red light districts of Kamathipura and Falkland Road and Vashi Turbhe in Navi Mumbai.

Institutional Placement Program (IPP)

When the mother of a child approaches Prerana with a request to de-link the child from the red light area, and place him or her into a healthy environment, Prerana supports the mother to consider the option of shifting the child to a place that can provide long term residential care and development. Prerana selects the institutions, pays follow-up visits to the institutions which involve the Child Welfare Committee, and provides initiatives for support like mother’s meetings, counseling and group homes. The system ensures that children are given access to residential institutional care until they can return to a safe environment or until they turn 18 years of age. Currently, the IPP has impacted over 1200 children. 
  
Anti-Trafficking Center (ATC)

External agencies including The Department of State for the US Government encouraged Prerana to start a specialized resource centre on trafficking problems and anti-trafficking. The ATC opened in 1999. A few of the services provided by ATC are training and sensitization, research and documentation, policy consultancy, advocacy, information dissemination, amongst others.

Naunihal Girls' Shelter

The Naunihal Special Home for Girls opened on 27 October 2010. The Naunihal Home provides girls with educational programs, vocational and livelihood courses, medical check-ups, arranges meetings with the girls’ mothers or guardians and provides additional recreational activities. Naunihal means "sapling" in Hindi.

Post Rescue Operation (PRO)

Prerana steps in to support rescued girls who are traumatized and vulnerable to re-trafficking with victim assistance and witness protection services. Services include residential care, vocational training, job placement, psycho-social counselling and legal support.

Aarambh

Aarambh is a joint initiative of Prerana and the ADM Capital Foundation. Its focus is to address issues related to child sexual exploitation from multiple perspectives including prevention, protection, legal intervention, and advocacy. The initiative aims to demonstrate and document best practices in child protection as well as implement the law on Protection of Children from Sexual Offenses in India.

In 2016, Aarambh launched India's first online hotline for reporting child pornography. When reports are made to this hotline by the police, general public, internet companies, or victims, experts from the UK-based Internet Watch Foundation assess the content. If the content is found to involve children, IWF experts take it down, block the URL, remove it from cyberspace, and alert Interpol.

The "Lakshmi" Initiative

The award-winning director Mr. Nagesh Kukunoor made the film Lakshmi in 2014 about the harsh realities of child sex trafficking in India. After the film was released, the "Lakshmi" Initiative was created in partnership with Prerana to prevent and protect girls from threats of trafficking, sexual abuse, and commercial sexual exploitation. The Initiative provides education and livelihood training opportunities to 'at-risk' girls.

Awards and achievements

 Star Foundation Award for Best Practices in Child Protection, 2009. 
 UNAIDS National Level 'Civil Society Award' for working for children affected by HIV/AIDS, 2007.  
 United Nations Best Practice Model of working with female victims of organized violence, 2000. 
 ECPAT International Best Practice Model of working for the protection of especially vulnerable children against trafficking and commercial sexual exploitation, 2001.

Prerana has been successful in influencing Indian policy making at various levels. The organization was instrumental in persuading the government to integrate a child trafficking policy into the country's 1998 National Plan. Following a public interest litigation filed in 2010 on the rehabilitation of sex workers, one of Prerana's founders, Priti Patkar, was appointed onto a Supreme Court panel to recommend possible amendments to the Immoral Traffic Prevention Act of 1956.

Its work has also been acknowledged internationally: its founder was nominated by the US government for the position of United Nations' Special Rapporteur on Human Trafficking in 2004. The organization made headlines in the US when Ramona Braganza, Scarlett Johansson's personal trainer, personally taught 15 girls that Prerana had rescued from the sex trade for her "3-2-1 Empower" program. In September 2015, these girls worked through a personal training certification program funded by the California National Association for Fitness Certification. Braganza described the project as her "legacy".

In 2014, Prerana had worked with 30,000 sex workers, rescued over 10,000 children, and extended victim assistance services to over 750 children from brothels.

Notes

External links
 
 http://bustedhalo.com/features/freeing-indias-sex-slaves
 Hindustan Times

Organizations that combat human trafficking
Organisations based in Mumbai
Children's rights organizations
Children's charities based in India
1986 establishments in Maharashtra
Organizations established in 1986